Ryan Millard (born 13 March 1987) is an Australian-born Fijian rugby league footballer who plays for the Wests Magpies in the New South Wales Cup. He is a Fijia international.

Background
Millard was born in Hurstville, Sydney, New South Wales, Australia.

Biography
His elder brother Daryl Millard plays for South Sydney Rabbitohs in the Australian National Rugby League and is also a Fijian international. Their father, Shane Millard, is the assistant coach of the Australian Fijian team. Shane is a former reserve-grade coach for the St George Dragons and also coached the USA Tomahawks. There is no relation between the family and journeyman Australian-born former USA international  and  Shane Millard, although this is sometimes reported as the case.

Career

Domestic
Ryan Millard played junior rugby league for Renown United and previously played in the youth teams at the St. George Illawarra Dragons, playing in the Jersey Flegg and SG Ball sides for the Dragons. He failed to make first grade with St. George Illawarra and moved with his brother to the Bulldogs for the 2007 season. He played in the New South Wales Cup for the Canterbury-Bankstown Bulldogs in 2008 and for the Newtown Jets in 2009. For the 2010 season he moved to the Shellharbour City Dragons, the New South Wales Cup team that act as a feeder club to the NRL club St. George Illawarra Dragons.

International
Millard played for Fiji against the Junior Kangaroos in a narrow 15–14 loss in 2007. He was not selected in either the wider training squad nor the final 25-man Fiji squad for the 2008 Rugby League World Cup. He made his full international debut for Fiji in the 2009 Pacific Cup. Millard has also represented the Australian Fijian team and was named Australian Fijian Fiji Bati Player of the Year for 2009. Millard is eligible to play for Fiji as he has a Fijian mother.

He was a late call-up to Fiji's 2013 Rugby League World Cup squad after John Sutton was ruled out before the tournament.

Following the 2013 Rugby League World Cup Millard followed in the footsteps of other Fijians and was signed by Hornets CEO Ryan Bradley for Rochdale Hornets

On 2 May 2015, Ryan played for Fiji in the Melanesian Cup test-match.

References

External links
Shellharbour City Dragons profile

1987 births
Australian rugby league players
Australian people of American descent
Australian people of Rotuman descent
Fiji national rugby league team players
Shellharbour City Dragons players
Newtown Jets NSW Cup players
Rugby league players from Sydney
Rugby league five-eighths
Living people